The Harlequin Tea Set is a short story collection written by Agatha Christie and first published in the US by G. P. Putnam's Sons on 14 April 1997. It contains nine short stories each of which involves a separate mystery. With the exception of "The Harlequin Tea Set", which was published in the collection Problem at Pollensa Bay, all stories were published in the UK in 1997 in the anthology While the Light Lasts and Other Stories.

The collection of nine stories include: 
 "The Edge"
 "The Actress"
 "While the Light Lasts"
 "The House of Dreams"
 "The Lonely God"
 "Manx Gold"
 "Within a Wall"
 "The Mystery of the Spanish Chest" (a Hercule Poirot story)
 "The Harlequin Tea Set" (a Harley Quin story)

Publication history
 1997, Putnam, 14 April 1997, Hardcover, 281 pp; 
 1998, Berkley Books, 1 December 1998, Paperback;

External links
The Harlequin Tea Set and Other Stories at the official Agatha Christie website

1997 short story collections
Short story collections by Agatha Christie
Hercule Poirot short story collections
Books published posthumously
G. P. Putnam's Sons books